Awake: The Best of Live is a greatest hits album by Live, released in 2004. The 19-track compilation includes songs from Live's first six studio albums as well as "We Deal in Dreams", an unreleased track from the Throwing Copper sessions, and a cover of "I Walk the Line" by Johnny Cash, recorded for the 2001 compilation Good Rockin' Tonight – The Legacy of Sun Records. The deluxe edition includes a DVD containing 22 music videos and a 30-minute interview with lead singer Ed Kowalczyk. The liner notes were written by Kowalczyk and Ken Wilber and the cover features a still from the video for the song "Lightning Crashes".

Track listing
Compact Disc
"Operation Spirit (The Tyranny of Tradition)" – 3:18
"Pain Lies on the Riverside" (new edit) – 4:32
"The Beauty of Gray" – 4:12
"Selling the Drama" – 3:25
"I Alone" (new edit) – 3:40
"Lightning Crashes" – 5:24
"All Over You" – 3:57
"Pillar of Davidson" (new edit) – 4:23
"We Deal in Dreams" – 3:55
"Lakini's Juice" (new edit) – 4:49
"Turn My Head" – 3:55
"The Dolphin's Cry" (new edit) – 4:19
"Run to the Water" – 4:26
"Dance with You" – 4:36
"Overcome" – 4:15
"Nobody Knows" – 4:27
"Heaven" – 3:46
"Run Away" (with Shelby Lynne) – 3:27
"I Walk the Line" (Johnny Cash cover) – 3:03

The European release of Awake does not feature "Pain Lies on the Riverside" or "Pillar of Davidson", but instead contains "They Stood Up for Love" (acoustic version) and "The Distance".

The Australian release also omits "Pain Lies on the Riverside" and "Pillar of Davidson" but includes "Rattlesnake" and "They Stood Up for Love".

DVD
"Operation Spirit"
"Operation Spirit" (live performance)
"Pain Lies on the Riverside"
"Pain Lies on the Riverside" (live performance)
"Selling the Drama"
"I Alone"
"Lightning Crashes"
"White, Discussion"
"Lakini's Juice"
"Freaks"
"Turn My Head" (directed by Jake Scott)
"Turn My Head" (directed by Mary Lambert)
"Ghost"
"The Dolphin's Cry"
"Run to the Water"
"They Stood Up for Love"
"Overcome"
"Simple Creed"
"Like a Soldier"
"Heaven" (live at Vorst National, Brussels)
"Heaven" (concept version)
"Run Away" (with Shelby Lynne)
Interview with Ed Kowalczyk

Chart performance

Weekly charts

Year-end charts

Singles
 "We Deal in Dreams" (#47 Netherlands)

Certifications

References

2004 greatest hits albums
Albums produced by Jerry Harrison
Live (band) compilation albums
Compilation albums by American artists
2004 video albums
Music video compilation albums
Live (band) video albums
Radioactive Records albums